Liongo is a village in the Buea Subdivision in the Fako Division of the South West Region of Cameroon.

Overview 
Liongo is  third class chiefdom in the Buea Council Area. It is home to Cameroonians mostly of the Bakweri origin

Notable institutions 
G.S.S Liongo

References 

Populated places in Southwest Region (Cameroon)